W.I.C.K.E.D. (short for  Wish I Could Kill Every Day) is the seventh studio album by American hip hop duo Twiztid. Released on March 17, 2009, it is the group's highest charting album, peaking at #11 on the Billboard 200. The album is also the fourth-highest charting album in Psychopathic Records history, beaten only by Insane Clown Posse's The Amazing Jeckel Brothers, Bang! Pow! Boom!, and The Mighty Death Pop!, all of which peaked at #4.

Production
Soon after the album title was released, it was revealed in the new year's edition of the Weekly Freeekly Weekly that Eric Davie would be producing the album.

Release
W.I.C.K.E.D. was released in three different versions. Best Buy & iTunes sold an exclusive version with 3 additional tracks. Hot Topic sold a version with a comic based on the song "Bella Morte" included, and a third version sold at various music stores included an enhanced disk including music videos for the songs "Buckets of Blood" and "Ha Ha Ha Ha Ha Ha". Psychopathic Records' store Hatchetgear will be selling all three versions, in addition to a standard version without any extras. All versions come with one of ten Psychopathic Records Trading Card. The album leaked two weeks prior to its release.

W.I.C.K.E.D. is currently Twiztid's highest charting album, peaking at #11 on the Billboard 200, #4 on the Top Rap Albums chart, #1 on the Top Independent Albums chart and #1 on the Top Internet Albums chart. W.I.C.K.E.D. is the third-highest charting album in Psychopathic Records history, after Insane Clown Posse's The Amazing Jeckel Brothers and Bang! Pow! Boom!, both of which peaked at #4. Twiztid stated in a December 4, 2014 interview that they plan to rerelease the album as well as Abominationz.

On May 13, 2015 it was announced that Twiztid has acquired the rights to W.I.C.K.E.D., and will release the album on a blood red double vinyl on August 21, 2015.

Reception

Allmusic reviewer David Jeffries praised the album, writing "This is a serious step up from their previous album, the inconsistent Independent's Day, and an obvious favorite for those who like their Psychopathic releases to be less street, more theatrical." horroryearbook reviewer Brain Hammer described it as Twiztid's best album, writing "It stands out to me as the most original record they have done, and it has the most horror influence too. Horror fans who have never checked out Twiztid in the past should give this record a spin."

Track listing

Personnel
Information taken from Allmusic.

Entire Album Written By Twiztid
Production Was Handled By Eric Davie, Monoxide, Lost Koast Productions, Micheal "Seven" Summers & Brian Kuma
Director Of Photography: E-Wolf
Guitars By Randy Lynch, Justin Ruffin & Willie E.
Scratching By DJ Clay
Production Designer: Jim Neve
Additional Graphics By Brian Debler
Additional Vocals By Ashley Heidrich, Blaze Ya Dead Homie, Leach Compagnoni & Simms Welden
"Belle Morte" Model: Marsida Cami

Charts

References

2009 albums
Twiztid albums
Psychopathic Records albums
Albums produced by Seven (record producer)